Charaxes (Polyura) gilolensis is a butterfly in the family Nymphalidae. It was described by Arthur Gardiner Butler in 1869. It is endemic to the Moluccas in Indonesia.

Subspecies
C. g. gilolensis (Batjan, Halmahera)
C. g. obiensis (Rothschild, 1898) (Obi Island)
C. g. buruana (Rothschild, 1898) (Buru Island)

References

External links
Polyura Billberg, 1820 at Markku Savela's Lepidoptera and Some Other Life Forms

Polyura
Butterflies described in 1869
Butterflies of Indonesia
Taxa named by Arthur Gardiner Butler